Galla-Sidamo Governorate was one of the six governorates of Italian East Africa. It was formed in 1936 from parts of the conquered Ethiopian Empire following the Second Italo-Ethiopian War with the capital was Jimma. In November 1938 some territory of Galla-Sidamo in the Scioa region was given to the neighboring Addis Abeba Governorate, enlarging it to the Scioa Governorate.

The area bordering the Anglo-Egyptian Sudan was the stronghold of the Ethiopian resistance against the Italians until 1939, when it was practically pacified. 

The Governorate of Galla-Sidamo was subdivided into:

See also 
List of Governors of the Galla-Sidamo Governorate
Italian Ethiopia

Bibliography
Beltrami, Vanni. "Italia d'oltremare. Storie dei territori italiani dalla conquista alla caduta." Edizioni Nuova Cultura. Roma, 2013  

Governorates of Italian East Africa